Nabu (  Nāvū or Nvō or Nāvō) is the ancient Mesopotamian patron god of literacy, the rational arts, scribes, and wisdom.

Etymology and meaning
The Akkadian "nabû" means 'announcer/authorised person', derived from the Semitic root . It is cognate with the Syriac , Arabic , and the Hebrew , all meaning 'prophet'.

History
Nabu was worshiped by the Babylonians and the Assyrians. Nabu gained prominence among the Babylonians in the 1st millennium BC when he was identified as the son of the god Marduk.

Nabu was worshipped in Babylon's sister city Borsippa, from where his statue was taken to Babylon each New Year so that he could pay his respects to his father. Nabu's symbols included a stylus resting on a tablet as well as a simple wedge shape; King Nabonidus, whose name references Nabu, had a royal sceptre topped with Nabu's wedge. Clay tablets with especial calligraphic skill were used as offerings at Nabu's temple. His wife was the Akkadian goddess Tashmet.

Nabu was the patron god of scribes, literacy, and wisdom. He was also the inventor of writing, a divine scribe, the patron god of the rational arts, and a god of vegetation. As the god of writing, Nabu inscribed the fates assigned to men and he was equated with the scribe god Ninurta. As an oracle he was associated with the Mesopotamian moon god Sin.  Originally the planet Mercury was connected with Ninurta (as well as Saturn); because in the MUL.APIN Ninurta is consistently identified with Mercury, and it is read that: "Mercury whose name is Ninurta travels the (same) path the Moon travels." As Marduk took over the role of King of the gods from Enlil and inherited both his cultic roles and epithets as well as his position within the pantheon – the role of the most important son of the father of the gods that had previously belonged to Ninurta as son of Enlil (now replaced by Marduk); was thus taken over by Nabu, and Nabu became associated with the planet Mercury as well as being given connections with the moon god Sin, because as addressed in the MUL.APIN – even when Mercury was considered the planet of Ninurta, it still retained some moon-like aspects since it traveled the same path of the moon. 

Nabu wore a horned cap, and stood with his hands clasped in the ancient gesture of priesthood. He rode on a winged dragon known as Sirrush that originally belonged to his father Marduk. In Babylonian astrology, Nabu was identified with the planet Mercury.

Nabu was continuously worshipped until the 2nd century, when cuneiform became a lost art.

Today in Mandaean cosmology, the name for Mercury is Nbu, which is derived from the name Nabu.

Outside Mesopotamia
Nabu's cult spread to ancient Egypt. Nabu was one of five non-Egyptian deities worshipped in Elephantine.

In the Bible, Nabu is mentioned as Nebo in Isaiah 46:1 and Jeremiah 48:1. 

In Hellenistic times, Nabu was sometimes identified with the Greek Apollo as a giver of prophesies. As the god of wisdom and a divine messenger, Nabu was linked with the Greek Hermes, the Roman Mercury, and the Egyptian Thoth.

References

Bibliography

External links

Arts gods
Creators of writing systems
Deities in the Hebrew Bible
Knowledge gods
Mercurian deities
Mesopotamian gods
Scribes
Wisdom gods